The Eugene Chargers were a team in the International Basketball League based in Eugene, Oregon. The team was coached by Kenya Wilkins and played home games at Northwest Christian University's Morse Events Center. Founded in 2006, the team did not compete in the 2008 IBL season.

2006 Season
The Chargers went 13-7 in the regular season. Guard Larry Morinia led the team in scoring, with 24.8ppg. The Chargers' attack was led by Morinia, who was an all-star, alongside center Bonell Colas (22.6 ppg) and forward J.R. Patrick (21.7 ppg)

Roster & Coaching Staff
Roster for the 2007 season

Season By Season

All-Stars

2006
 Bonell Colas
 Larry Morinia
 J. R. Patrick
 Andy Perry
 Travis Melvin

2007
 Charles Easterling
 Solomon Yearby

References

International Basketball League teams
Bushnell University
Basketball teams established in 2006
2006 establishments in Oregon
Defunct basketball teams in Oregon
2007 disestablishments in Oregon
Sports clubs disestablished in 2007
Sports in Eugene, Oregon